Polystachya laxiflora is a species of orchid native to western and west-central tropical Africa.

laxiflora
Orchids of Africa